Nationality words link to articles with information on the nation's poetry or literature (for instance, Irish or France).

Events
 German poet and critic Heinrich Wilhelm von Gerstenberg begins publication of his Briefe über Merkwürdigkeiten der Litteratur in which he formulates the literary principles of Sturm und Drang.

Works published
 Mark Akenside, An Ode to the Late Thomas Edwards
 John Cunningham, Poems, Chiefly Pastoral
 Isaac D'Israeli, The Literary Character
 John Freeth, The Political Songster
 Oliver Goldsmith, editor, Poems for Young Ladies, an anthology published this year, although the book states "1767"
 Francis Hopkinson, "A Psalm of Thanksgiving", English, Colonial America
 Charles Jenner, Poems
 Thomas Letchworh, "A Morning and Evening's Meditation; or, A Descant on the Times", English, Colonial America
 Henry James Pye, Beauty
 Anna Williams, Miscellanies in Prose and Verse

Births
Death years link to the corresponding "[year] in poetry" article:
 January 3 - Nguyễn Du (died 1820), Vietnamese poet
 April 27 - Vasily Pushkin (died 1830), Russian poet
 October 11 - Nólsoyar Páll (lost at sea c.1808), Faroese merchant and poet
 December 3 - Robert Bloomfield (died 1823), English "ploughboy poet" 
 Maharaja Chandu Lal (died 1845), Indian Urdu- and Persian-language poet and politician
 Martha Llwyd (died 1845), Welsh poet and hymnodist

Deaths
Birth years link to the corresponding "[year] in poetry" article:
 September 23 - John Brown (born 1715), English clergyman, essayist and poet
 c. November - Catherine Jemmat, née Yeo (born c.1714), English memoirist and anthologist
 December 12 - Johann Christoph Gottsched (born 1700), German critic
 December 24 - James Grainger (born c.1721), Scottish-born doctor, poet and translator, of "West Indian fever" in Saint Kitts
 Robert Andrews (born 1723), English Presbyterian minister, poet and translator, insane
 Hazin Lahiji (born 1692), Persian poet and scholar

See also

Poetry
List of years in poetry

Notes

18th-century poetry
Poetry